Mikkelin Jukurit is a professional ice hockey team in Liiga, the top tier Finnish ice hockey league. They play in Mikkeli, Finland, at the Kalevankankaan jäähalli (known since 2016 as Ikioma Areena). The team has won 7 Mestis (2nd highest level) championships (2001, 2002, 2003, 2006, 2013, 2015, and 2016).

History
Mikkelin Jukurit was founded in 1970. During the 1970s Jukurit played on the second highest level but the 80's and 90's they spent on lower levels. The season of 1998-99 was a turning point for the team, when Matti Turunen became the executive director and Risto Dufva from Jyväskylä became head coach. In the 1999–2000 season they won their first championship in the newly established Suomi-sarja league, and returned to the Mestis after a 20-year break. Jukurit won the Mestis championship on their first three seasons in Mestis and made the semifinals consecutively on their first 8 seasons. When Jukurit had won a fourth championship in spring 2006, Risto Dufva left the team. After this, Finnish hockey legend Reijo Ruotsalainen was hired as head coach but he was replaced mid-season by a long-time assistant coach Pekka Lipiäinen. The season 2008-2009 was the only Mestis season Jukurit didn't make the playoffs.

In 2009 an incorporation Jukurit HC Oy was founded. Until this the team had operated as an association.

After hiring Jarno Pikkarainen as head coach for the 2010-11 season, Jukurit returned to the finals but lost to Sport. Under Pikkarainen Jukurit won another championship in 2012-13 and two more in 2015 and 2016 with Antti Pennanen as head coach.

After the team's 7th Mestis championship, Jukurit was granted a permission to purchase a licence to Liiga, the top league in Finnish ice hockey. During the team's 16 seasons in Mestis, they achieved 7 gold medals, 4 silver medals, and one bronze medal.

Since the season 2016-2017 Jukurit has played in Liiga. During the first 4 seasons, the team has yet to make the playoffs, finishing 11th, 13th, 14th, and 13th in the regular season.

Coached by former NHL player Olli Jokinen, Jukurit sensationally finished second in the regular season of 2021-2022, reaching their first ever playoff spot.

Personnel

Current roster
Updated February 13, 2022

Team officials
Updated January 8, 2022

Retired numbers
# 12 Antti Laakso
# 22 Martti Salminen
# 24 Lasse Kanerva
# 31 Petri Lehtonen
Number 21 is not in circulation, it belonged to Sami Lehmusmetsä who died in a traffic accident.

Captains

Head coaches

Notable players

G Tero Leinonen
G Mikko Strömberg
D Kalle Kaijomaa
D Marko Kauppinen
D Tommi Kovanen
D Jukka-Pekka Laamanen
D Mikko Mäenpää
D Simo Mälkiä
D Joni Tuominen
D Ilkka Vaarasuo
F Mikko Hakkarainen
F Iivo Hokkanen
F Juha-Pekka Hytönen
F Petri Koskinen
F Niko Laakkonen
F Pentti Nöyränen
F Olli Sipiläinen
F Erkka Westerlund
F,C Pentti Matikainen
C Sergei Krivokrasov
HC Risto Dufva
HC Olli Jokinen
HC Reijo Ruotsalainen

Notes:
G = Goaltender, D = Defenceman, F = Forward, HC = Head coach, C = Coach

References

External links
 

Mestis teams
Mikkeli
Liiga teams
1970 establishments in Finland
Liiga